Nazarene Crying Towel is an album by roots music band Lost Dogs, released on BEC Records in 2003.

Track listing
 "Moses In the Desert" (Taylor/Roe)  (2:32)
 "There You Are" (Taylor/Roe)  (3:08)
 "Deeper In The Heart" (Taylor)  (2:24)
 "Come Down Here" (Roe)  (2:52)
 "Be My Hiding Place" (Taylor)  (3:52)
 "Jesus On The Shore" (Taylor)  (2:18)
 "Mercy Again" (Taylor)  (2:12)
 "Cry Out Loud" (Roe/Daugherty)  (3:14)
 "The Yearning" (Taylor)  (3:04)
 "Crushing Hand" (Taylor)  (1:58)
 "Home Again" (Taylor)  (2:53)
 "Darkest Night" (Taylor)  (3:48)

The band
Derri Daugherty — guitars and vocals
Mike Roe — guitars, bass, and vocals
Terry Scott Taylor — guitars and vocals

Additional musicians
Tim Chandler — bass
Steve Hindalong — percussion
Dennis "The Foot" Holt — drums
Phil Madeira — piano, dobro, lap steel, harmonium, percussion

Production notes
Recorded during the Spring of 2002 @ Planet Of Tapes, Brentwood, Tennessee by Phil Madeira.
Sweetened & Mixed during the Summer 2002 @ Neverland Studios, Brentwood, Tennessee by Derri Daugherty.
Mastered during the  Fall 2002 @ Audio Production Group, Orangevale, California by Ralph Stover.
Art Direction @ Design by Brian Heydn.
Photography by Amanda Feavel.
Band photography by Dinah K. Kotthoff.

References

Lost Dogs albums
2003 albums
Tooth & Nail Records albums